Harrison Township is one of fourteen townships in Miami County, Indiana, United States. As of the 2010 census, its population was 759 and it contained 281 housing units.

History
Harrison Township was organized in 1846. It is named for William Henry Harrison, ninth President of the United States.

Geography

Unincorporated towns
 McGrawsville at 
 North Grove at

Extinct towns
 Cary
 Snow Hill

Cemeteries
The township contains these five cemeteries: Barnhart, Gerber, Hershberger, Kendall and North Grove.

Major highways
  Indiana State Road 18
  Indiana State Road 19

Education
 Maconaquah School Corporation

Harrison Township residents may obtain a free library card from the Converse-Jackson Township Public Library in Converse.

Political districts
 Indiana's 5th congressional district
 State House District 32
 State Senate District 18

References
 
 United States Census Bureau 2008 TIGER/Line Shapefiles
 IndianaMap

External links
 Indiana Township Association
 United Township Association of Indiana
 City-Data.com page for Harrison Township

Townships in Miami County, Indiana
Townships in Indiana